The president of Tufts University is the chief administrator of the university and is appointed by the chair of the Board of Trustees of Tufts College. The president is appointed by the board who leads and directs the university, approves the university's mission and purpose, institutional policies and alterations in academic programs, guards the university's finances and sets an example of generous financial support. The current incumbent is Anthony Monaco, formerly the pro-vice-chancellor of the University of Oxford.

Presidents of Tufts

References

External links
Official Website

Tufts